Quo graviora, or On the Pragmatic Constitution, was the name of an encyclical issued by Pope Gregory XVI on 4 October 1833. It was addressed to the bishops of Rhineland concerning the movement for reforms in ecclesiastical province of the Rhineland by that time.

External links
 Text of Quo Graviora by Pope Gregory XVI 

1833 in Christianity
1833 documents
1833 in Europe
Papal encyclicals
Documents of Pope Gregory XVI
History of the Rhineland
October 1833 events